The 40th Blue Dragon Film Awards ceremony was held on November 21, 2019 at Paradise City, Incheon. Organized by Sports Chosun (a sister brand of Chosun Ilbo), the annual award show honored the best in Korean language films that were released from October 12, 2018 to October 10, 2019. It was broadcast live on SBS.

Nominations and winners 

Winners are listed first, highlighted in boldface, and indicated with a double dagger.

Main awards

Other awards

Films with multiple wins 
The following films received multiple wins:

Films with multiple nominations 
The following films received multiple nominations:

Special performances

See also 

56th Baeksang Arts Awards
56th Grand Bell Awards

References 

2019 film awards
Blue Dragon Film Awards
2019 in South Korean cinema